Brian Gottfried was the defending champion and won in the final 6–2, 6–3, 7–5 against Mel Purcell.

Seeds

  Brian Gottfried (champion)
  Tomáš Šmíd (first round)
  Wojciech Fibak (first round)
  Anders Järryd (semifinals)
  Mel Purcell (final)
  Stefan Simonsson (second round)
  Mark Dickson (quarterfinals)
  Eric Korita (quarterfinals)

Draw

Final

Section 1

Section 2

External links
 1983 Fischer-Grand Prix draw

Singles